Bonino is a surname. Notable people with the surname include:

 Angie Bonino, artist and graphic designer
 Emma Bonino (born 1948), Italian politician
 Ernesto Bonino (1922–2008), Italian singer
 Nick Bonino (born 1988), American ice hockey player